Sindos (is a suburb of Thessaloniki, Greece. It is the seat of the municipality of Delta. Sindos is home to the main campus of the Alexander Technological Educational Institute of Thessaloniki and the Industrial Zone of the city. The community Sindos has an area of 47.248 km2. The population was 9,289 at the 2011 census.

In antiquity, Sindos was noted by Herodotus (vii. 123); and Stephanus of Byzantium as a maritime town of Mygdonia in Macedonia, between Therme and Chalastra.

References

Populated places in Thessaloniki (regional unit)